Miguel Alejandro Nuño Medina (born December 1, 1993) is a Mexican footballer who plays as a striker for Deportivo CAFESSA Jalisco in the Liga Premier de México.

Career

C.D. Guadalajara
Nuño spent his whole youth career at C.D. Guadalajara's youth academy.

Loan at Coras
In July 2014, it was announced Nuño was sent out on loan to Ascenso MX club Coras de Tepic in order to gain professional playing experience. He made his professional debut on 22 August 2014 against Atlante. Miguel nuno loan contract expired in June 2016 and he was sent back to Guadalajara to play with the senior team

References

External links
 

1993 births
Living people
Association football forwards
C.D. Guadalajara footballers
Deportivo CAFESSA Jalisco footballers
Loros UdeC footballers
C.D. Tepatitlán de Morelos players
Ascenso MX players
Liga Premier de México players
Tercera División de México players
Footballers from Jalisco
Mexican footballers